The Danish National Cycle Routes (Danish: Danmarks nationale cykelruter) together form the national cycling route network of Denmark. There are currently 11 such long-distance cycling routes across Denmark largely established mainly to promote bicycle tourism.

Routes
There are 11 National Cycle Routes in Denmark. (Note that there is no 11th route, but there is a 12th!)

See also
Cycling in Denmark
National cycling route network
EuroVelo

References

External links
Danish Cyclist Union
Vejdirektoratet

National cycling route networks